The women's lyonnaise progressive event in boules sports at the 2009 World Games took place from 20 to 22 July 2009 at the 228 Memorial Park in Kaohsiung, Taiwan.

Competition format
A total of 6 athletes entered the competition. Best four athletes from preliminary round qualifies to the semifinals. Best two athletes from this stage advances to gold medal match.

Results

Preliminary

Semifinal

Finals

References

External links
 Results on IWGA website

Boules sports at the 2009 World Games